Linda is a female given name, of German origin, but widespread in the English-speaking world since the end of the nineteenth century. The German name Linde was originally an abbreviated form of older names such as Dietlinde and Sieglinde. In the form Linda it was used by the writer Jean Paul for a leading character in his four-volume novel Titan, published 1800–1803, and it became popular in German-speaking countries thereafter.

The name-element Linde is possibly derived from the same root as the linden tree, with reference to a shield made of that wood, but may have become associated with Germanic lind meaning "soft, tender", the image of the tree being used to indicate a gentle personality. Subsequent support for its appeal may have come from the neo-Latin language (Italian, Spanish or Portuguese) word linda, which is the feminine form of lindo, meaning "beautiful, pretty, cute" (Spanish and Portuguese) and "clean" (Italian). It is also a common name in South Africa, Linda, meaning "Wait" (IsiZulu and IsiXhosa).

Among other names in use in English-speaking countries that include the -linda suffix are Melinda, Belinda, Celinda, and Rosalinda.

The name days for Linda are on February 13 (Hungary, Poland), April 15 (Finland/Germany), June 19 (Switzerland), June 20 (Sweden), June 25 (Estonia), August 21 (Latvia), September 1 (Czech Republic), September 2 (Slovakia), and September 4 (Poland).

In the Albanian version, Linda is a feminine name which means "birth" or "fertility". The masculine form is Lind. In South African terms the name Linda means "wait" and is not gender based; similar names are Lindiwe also meaning "waited for" but often just written as Lindi in short. Lindokuhle (waiting for something beautiful) and its short form Lindo are related South African-American names.

Notable people
 Linda Barker, British television presenter and interior designer
 Linda L. M. Bennett, American political scientist 
 Linda Blair, American actress
 Linda Bolder, Israeli-Dutch Olympic judoka
 Linda Bove, American actress
 Linda Brasil (born 1973), Brazilian politician
 Linda Burney (born 1957), Australian politician 
 Linda Carter Brinson, American journalist and writer
 Linda Lee Cadwell, American teacher, widow of martial artist Bruce Lee
 Linda Cardellini, American actress
 Linda Carter (disambiguation), several people
 Linda Chung, Chinese-Canadian actress
 Linda Clement, Scottish field hockey player
 Linda Coffee, American lawyer, known for representing Jane Roe in Roe v. Wade
 Linda Consolante, Canadian football (soccer) defender
 Linda Cristal, Argentinian actress
 Linda Dano, American actress, businesswoman, writer
 Linda Darnell, American actress
 Linda de Mol, Dutch entertainer
 Linda Dunikoski, American lawyer and prosecutor 
 Linda Eder, American Broadway singer and actress
 Linda Evans, American actress
 Linda Evangelista, Canadian supermodel
 Linda Fairstein (born 1947), American author and former prosecutor
 Linda Fiorentino, Italian-American actress
 Linda Grant (born 1951), British writer 
 Linda Grant DePauw (born 1940), American historian and author 
 Linda Gray, American actress
 Linda Haglund, Swedish short-distance runner
 Linda M. Haines (born 1944), English/ South African statistician
 Linda Halimi, Albanian singer and songwriter
 Linda Hamilton, American actress
 Linda Hargreaves, British actress
 Linda Henry (born 1963), British actress
 Linda Hesse (born 1987), German singer 
 Linda Hogan (ethicist) (born 1964), Irish ethicist, theologian and academic
 Linda Hogan (writer) (born 1947), Native American writer and environmentalist
 Linda Hogan (TV personality), American television personality, ex-wife of professional wrestler Hulk Hogan
 Linda Hunt (born 1945), American actress
 Linda King, American sculptor, playwright and poet
 Linda King (bowls), former Hong Kong international lawn and indoor bowler
 Linda King (virologist), virologist in the UK
 Linda Knowles, British high jumper
 Linda Kuk, Hong Kong film producer
 Linda Lai Chiu-han, Hong Kong-based academic, artist, curator and art historian
 Linda Lampenius, Finnish violinist
 Linda Lanzillotta (born 1948), Italian politician
 Linda Larkin, American actress
 Linda Lavin, American actress
 Linda Lawton, British researcher in cyanobacteria 
 Linda Liao, Taiwanese celebrity
 Linda Lingle, governor of Hawaii
 Linda Lovelace, American former pornographic actress, later anti-pornography activist
 Linda Lucero, American artist
 Linda Lusardi (born 1958), British actress, television presenter
 Linda Mazri (born 2001), Algerian badminton player
 Linda McCartney (1941–1998), American photographer, first wife of Paul McCartney
 Linda McMahon, American professional wrestling executive and politician
 Linda Ohama, Canadian artist and filmmaker
 Linda Ojastu (1936–2006), Estonian sprinter, hurdler and coach
 Linda Olofsson, Swedish freestyle swimmer
 Linda Papadopoulos, English-Greek psychologist
 Linda Pearson (born 1964), Scottish sport shooter
 Linda Perry, American singer-songwriter 
 Linda Pétursdóttir, Icelandic businesswoman, Miss World 1988
 Linda Porter (actress) (1933–2019), American actress
 Linda Purl, American actress
 Linda Reichl (born 1942), American physicist
 Linda Reid (born 1959), Canadian politician and former MLA
 Linda Ronstadt, American singer
 Linda Schrenko, American politician from the state of Georgia
 Linda Seppänen, Swedish singer 
 Linda Sheskey, American middle distance runner
 Linda J. Silberman, American lawyer
 Linda Smith (disambiguation), several people
 Linda Staudt, Canadian long-distance runner
 Linda Sundblad (born 1981), Swedish singer
 Linda Teuteberg (born 1981), German politician 
 Linda Thompson (disambiguation), several people
 Linda Tripp, Pentagon employee involved in the Lewinsky scandal of U.S. President Bill Clinton
 Linda Voortman, Dutch politician
 Linda Wagenmakers (born 1975), Dutch singer
 Linda Winikow (1940–2008), New York state senator
 Linda Zhang, American automotive engineer
 Linda Züblin, Swiss heptathlete

Fictional characters 
 Linda, in the 2009 American comedy film The Hangover
 Linda, a character on the children's television program Sesame Street
 Linda, a character in Estonian mythology
 Linda Belcher, wife of Bob Belcher in the animated comedy Bob's Burgers 
 Supergirl (Linda Danvers), a DC Comics superhero
 Linda Flynn-Fletcher, the mother of Phineas in the Disney Channel animated series Phineas and Ferb
 Linda Gergenblatt, a character in the 2012 American comedy film Wanderlust
 Linda Gunderson, the protagonist of the 2011 animated film Rio
 Linda Melinda, the main protagonist in video game DreadOut
 Linda Radlett, a character in The Pursuit of Love by Nancy Mitford
 Linda Twist, a character in the Australian television series Round the Twist
 Linda Woodward, a character in The Three Clerks by Anthony Trollope

References

English feminine given names
Estonian feminine given names
Feminine given names